The 2011 Svenska Cupen final was played on 5 November 2011. Kalmar FF faced Helsingborgs IF. Kalmar FF qualified for the final by beating IFK Göteborg in the first semi-final on 14 September 2011, Helsingborgs IF qualified by beating Örebro SK in the second semi-final on 29 October 2011. Since Kalmar FF were drawn as the away team in the final, it was played at Olympia in Helsingborg. Kalmar FF played their first final since 2008 and were looking to secure their fourth cup title overall. Helsinborgs IF played their second consecutive final and won their second consecutive title and fifth title in total by winning the match 3–1.

Road to the Final

Match details

See also
2011 Svenska Cupen

External links
Svenska Cupen at svenskfotboll.se

2011
Cupen
Helsingborgs IF matches
Kalmar FF matches

November 2011 sports events in Europe
Sports competitions in Helsingborg
21st century in Skåne County